Marie-Solange Kayisire is a politician in Rwanda, who has served as the Minister of Cabinet Affairs, in the Office of the Prime Minister and a member of the Rwandan cabinet, since 31 August 2017.

Political career 
Marie-Solange Kayisire served as the Minister of Cabinet Affairs, in the Office of the Prime Minister and as a member of the Rwandan cabinet, since 31 August 2017.

On 2nd March 2020, the outgoing Minister in charge of Emergency management Germaine Kamayirese handed over to the new Minister Kayisire Marie-Solange. She stated that enhancing Disaster Prevention and Mitigation as well as public awareness will be among her top priorities.

Commitments

Refugees 
Marie-Solange Kayisire heavily involved in making refugees lives better. She inaugurated the maternity ward constructed in Mahama refugee camp with funds from the Government and the people of Japan.

Unity Club 
The Minister of Emergency management is also the Vice-President of a club called the "Unity Club", an organization that brings together current and former members of the current cabinet.

Unity Club is focused on making sure that bad history tainted by hate has no place in Rwandan society.

Environment 
In 2022 attended a meeting between the government of Rwanda and a company called Planet Labs PBC to discuss how to leverage satellite imagery data to improve environmental, agricultural, and disaster management among areas in Rwanda.

See also
 Parliament of Rwanda
 Prime Minister of Rwanda

References

External links
Website of the Rwanda Ministry of Cabinet Affairs
Premier Ngirente pledges to 'serve with devotion'

Living people
Year of birth missing (living people)
Women government ministers of Rwanda
21st-century Rwandan politicians
21st-century Rwandan women politicians
Government ministers of Rwanda